Jozua Francois Malherbe (born 14 March 1991) is a South African rugby union professional player.

Early life

Malherbe attended Paarl Boys' High School, where he also captained the First Rugby team to victory in Interschools in his Matric year.

Career

Malherbe made both his senior Western Province and Stormers debuts in 2011, however it was the following year when he fully cemented his place in both sides. He played in every Stormers match during the 2012 Super Rugby season and only missed one match in Western Province's successful 2012 Currie Cup Premier Division campaign when he provided injury cover for  squad on their tour of Australasia. He was a starter as Province upset the  25–18 in Durban to become a Currie Cup winner at the age of 21.

He made 11 appearances during the 2013 Super Rugby season before an injury ended his campaign and forced him to miss the majority of the 2013 Currie Cup season. He made his comeback towards the back end of the campaign making 4 appearances from the bench and helping Province reach their second successive Currie Cup final.

International

Malherbe had been involved in several  squads since the appointment of Heyneke Meyer as head coach in 2012 without making any appearances.   An injury to Jannie du Plessis meant he finally made his test debut on 9 November 2013 against  in Cardiff. He acquitted himself well despite facing the hugely experienced Gethin Jenkins on the other side of the scrum. He retained his place for the following week's match against  in Edinburgh, however an injury just before half time saw him withdrawn and his tour ended prematurely.

Malherbe was named in South Africa's squad for the 2019 Rugby World Cup. He also scored his first Test try in his career at his appearance off the bench on the final Springbok pool match against Canada. South Africa went on to win the tournament, defeating England in the final.

Statistics

Test Match Record

Pld = Games Played, W = Games Won, D = Games Drawn, L = Games Lost, Tri = Tries Scored, Pts = Points Scored

Super Rugby Statistics

References

External links
 
 

1991 births
Living people
South African rugby union players
Stormers players
Western Province (rugby union) players
Rugby union props
Afrikaner people
South African people of French descent
People from Somerset West
Alumni of Paarl Boys' High School
South Africa international rugby union players
Rugby union players from the Western Cape